The  is a single-car diesel multiple unit (DMU) train type operated by East Japan Railway Company (JR East) since November 2008.

Operations
Eight cars (numbered KiHa E120-1 to 8) are based at Aizu-Wakamatsu Depot and were used on the following routes.
 Tadami Line ( - , since March 2020)

Former operations
Until March 2020, eight cars (numbered KiHa E120-1 to 8) were based at Niitsu Depot and were used interchangeably with KiHa 110 series DMUs on the following routes.
 Banetsu West Line ( – )
 Uetsu Main Line (Niitsu – )
 Shinetsu Main Line (Niitsu – )
 Yonesaka Line
 Hakushin Line (Rapid Benibana and 1 local train only)

Exterior

The body design is based on the KiHa E200 DMU, and uses a new diesel engine reducing NOx emissions.

Externally, the orange colour scheme is intended to evoke the autumn leaf colour of the beech forests of the Iide mountains in Niigata, Fukushima, and Yamagata Prefectures.

In 2020, the livery of all cars was changed from orange one to green one, at the same time as the transfer from Niitsu Depot to Aizu-Wakamatsu Depot.

Interior
Passenger accommodation consists of 1+2 abreast facing seating bays in the centre of each car, and longitudinal bench seating at the ends of cars. Each car has a universal access toilet.

The cars are equipped with fare machines for use on wanman driver-only-operated services.

History
Eight cars were built by Niigata Transys in May 2008, entering revenue service from 1 November 2008.

References

External links

 JR East E120/E130 information 

120 series
East Japan Railway Company
Niigata Transys rolling stock
Train-related introductions in 2008